TV MS is a Brazilian television station based in Campo Grande, Mato Grosso do Sul, Brazil. It operates on channel 11 (32 UHF digital), and is affiliated with RecordTV. The station is part of the MS Integração de Rádio e Televisão Network, a communication group belonging to the entrepreneur Ivan Paes Barbosa, together with the Diário Digital portal, the MS Radio Network and the satellite channel AgroBrasil TV.

The station was inaugurated in February 1987 as TV MS, affiliated with Rede Manchete. It became a RecordTV affiliate in 1995.

References 

Television stations in Brazil
1987 establishments in Brazil
Television channels and stations established in 1987